is a railway station on the Kagoshima Main Line in Miyama, Fukuoka Prefecture, Japan.

Lines 
Local and rapid services on the line stop at the station.

Layout 
The station consists of a side and an island platform serving three tracks. The station building is a modern, flat-roofed concrete structure which houses a ticket window, automatic ticket vending machines and a waiting area. Access to the island platform is by means of a footbridge equipped with elevators. The footbridge also has an entrance on the other side of the tracks from the station.

Management of the station has been outsourced to the JR Kyushu Tetsudou Eigyou Co., a wholly owned subsidiary of JR Kyushu specialising in station services. It staffs the ticket counter which is equipped with a Midori no Madoguchi facility.

Adjacent stations

History
In the next phase of expansion, the track was extended south to Takase (now ) opening as the new southern terminus on 1 April 1891. Setaka, at that time named Yabegawa, was opened on the same day as one of several intermediate stations on the new stretch of track. When the Kyushu Railway was nationalized on 1 July 1907, Japanese Government Railways (JGR) took over control of the station. On 12 October 1909, the station became part of the Hitoyoshi Main Line and then on 21 November 1909, part of the Kagoshima Main Line. On 1 April 1942, the station was renamed Setaka-machi and then on 10 April 1956, renamed Setaka. With the privatization of Japanese National Railways (JNR), the successor of JGR, on 1 April 1987, JR Kyushu took over control of the station.

Passenger statistics
In fiscal 2016, the station was used by an average of 1,230 passengers daily (boarding passengers only), and it ranked 138th among the busiest stations of JR Kyushu.

References

External links
Setaka Station (JR Kyushu)

Railway stations in Japan opened in 1891
Railway stations in Fukuoka Prefecture